Travma is a Greek album by singer Anna Vissi released in Greece and Cyprus on April 14, 1997. In Greece it became Gold within 12 days and 3× Platinum within 6 months, becoming one of the most commercially successful albums of the Greek 1990s.
The album also includes a duet with fellow Greek pop star Sakis Rouvas.

Australian edition and Re-releases 
Travma was released in Australia with English-language liner notes (transliterating its title to Trauma, to match to the Australian audience) and packaging in mid-1997, to help promote the Australian leg of the Trauma tour and her recent English-language single debut for "Forgive Me This". The album was released in a special tour edition featuring a bonus disc with five songs from previous albums. Vissi promoted the album and tour by participating in a high-profile media campaign including press, radio, national television interviews, and in-store signings.

In 2008, Greek newspaper Isotimia was granted permission to release Travma as a covermount, parting its Megales Ihografiseis ("Great recordings") series of selected albums of Greek recording artists.

In 2019, the album was selected for inclusion in the Panik Gold box set The Legendary Recordings 1982-2019. The release came after Panik's acquisition rights of Vissi's back catalogue from her previous record company Sony Music Greece. This box set was printed on a limited edition of 500 copies containing CD releases of all of her albums from 1982 to 2019 plus unreleased material.

Music
Music and lyrics are by Nikos Karvelas and Natalia Germanou (tracks 4, 5, 10).

Track listing 
 "Travma" (Trauma)
 "Eki" (There)
 "Ntrepome" (I'm ashamed)
 "Siga!" (Slowly!)
 "Na 'Se Kala" (Be well)
 "To Katalaves?" (Got it?)
 "Me Niazi" (I do care)
 "Mavra Gialia" (Sunglasses)
 "Eprepe" (I should have)
 "Apolito Keno" (Absolute emptiness)
 "To Megalitero Soukse" (The biggest hit)
 "Thanatos Ine I Agapi" (Love is death)
 "Me Halai" (It makes me feel bad)
 "Se Thelo, Me Thelis" (Duet with Sakis Rouvas) (I want you, you want me)
 "Se Thimame" (I remember you)

Singles
 "Travma"
 "Mavra Gialia"
 "Na' Se Kala"

Australian release

Disc 1
 "Travma"
 "Eki"
 "Ntrepome"
 "Siga"
 "Na' Se Kala"
 "To Katalaves?"
 "Me Niazi"
 "Mavra Gialia"
 "Eprepe"
 "Apolito Keno"
 "To Megalitero Soukse"
 "Thanatos Ine I Agapi"
 "Me Halai"
 "Se Thelo, Me Thelis" (Duet with Sakis Rouvas)
 "Se Thimame"

Disc 2 [Bonus]
 "Sentonia" (from the album Klima Tropiko)
 "Trelenome" (from the album Klima Tropiko)
 "Amin" (from the album Re!)
 "Dodeka" (from the album Kati Simveni)
 "Lambo" (from the album Lambo)

Music videos
"Travma", "Na 'Se Kala", and "Mavra Gialia" were released on promotional videos during 1997, all directed by Vangelis Kalaitzis and aired in local TV stations. 

In 2001, "Mavra Gialia" was selected for digital release on Vissi's The Video Collection.

Credits and personnel

Personnel
Christina Anagnostopoulou - backing vocals
Joey Balin - guitar, keyboards on tracks 8, 12
Nikos Chatzopoulos - violin 
Achileas Diamantis - guitar on track 12
Vassilis Eleftheropoulos - backing vocals 
Natalia Germanou - lyrics, backing vocals
Spyros Glenis - percussions 
Nikos Karvelas - music, lyrics, acoustic guitar, backing 
Charalambos Kemanetzidis - keyboards
Dimitris Koliakoudakis - classic guitar 
Konstantinos - backing vocals 
Takis Kouvatseas - drums
Yiannis Lionakis - guitars, bouzouki, lute, tzouras, baglamas, üti
Kostas Miliotakis - keyboards 
Andreas Mouzakis - percussion on track 12
Vassilis Nikolopoulos - keyboard, programming on track 12
Christos Olympios - tzouras
Alexandros Paraskevopoulos - bass on tracks 8, 12
Sakis Rouvas - vocals 
Panagiotis Stergiou - tzouras, baglamas, üti on tracks 10, 15
Giorgos Tsolakos - keyboards
Nikos Vardis - bass 
Thanasis Vasilopoulos - clarinet
Anna Vissi - vocals, backing vocals

Production
Nikos Karvelas - production management, arrangements, instrumentation, instrument playing
Joey Balin - production management, arrangements, instrumentation, programming on tracks 8, 12
Charalambos Kemanetzidis - arrangements, instrumentation on tracks 7, 9, 10
Tasos Bakasietas - recording engineering on tracks 8, 12
Ronald Prent - recording engineering on tracks 8, 12
Giorgos Ragkos - recording engineering, mixing at Kiriazis Studios
Yiannis Ioannidis - digital mastering at Digital Press Hellas
Petros Siakavelas - digital mastering at D.P.H.

Design
Tasos Vrettos - photos
Yiannis Angelakis - make up
Stephanos Vasilakis - hair styling
Anna Vissi - styling
Antonis Glykos - artwork
Apostolos Michalis - photoshop 
Efi Karampesini - photoshop
Michalis Orfanos - cover printing

Credits adapted from the album's liner notes.

Charts

References 

Anna Vissi albums
1997 albums
Greek-language albums
Sony Music Greece albums